Zhurbenkoa is a genus of lichenicolous fungi in the family Malmideaceae. It has three species. The genus was circumscribed in 2019 by Adam Flakus, Javier Etayo, Sergio Pérez-Ortega, and Pamela Rodriguez-Flakus, with Zhurbenkoa epicladonia assigned as the type species. Closely related genera are Savoronala and Sprucidea. The generic name honours Russian lichenologist Mikhail Zhurbenko, "for his magnificent contribution to knowledge on the biodiversity and systematics of lichenicolous fungi, including lichen parasites colonizing Cladonia".

Zhurbenkoa fungi grow on the thalli of species in the widespread lichen genus Cladonia. They produce grayish-brown to almost black apothecia that lack margins, and have crystals interspersed in the epihymenium.

Species
Zhurbenkoa cladoniarum  – Brazil
Zhurbenkoa epicladonia  – Europe; South America
Zhurbenkoa latispora  – South America

References

Malmideaceae
Lecanorales genera
Taxa described in 2019
Lichenicolous fungi
Taxa named by Adam Grzegorz Flakus